La Loba (Fierce Angel) is a Mexican telenovela by TV Azteca. It premiered on  2010. The protagonists are the international stars Ivonne Montero and Mauricio Islas. Grand actors such as Regina Torne, Omar Fierro, Ana Ciochetti, Fernando Becerril, and Marta Aura also included as cast members.

Original version
Patricia Palmer created the original Argentine version, Los Angeles No Lloran. It was produced by Patricia Palmer, Alberto Marchi and Alejandro Moser. The original stars are Orlando Carrio and Patricia Palmer. Theme song in this version is also by Patricia Palmer.

Patricia Palmer joined the cast as Mina in La Loba.

Cast

Main 
 Mauricio Islas as Emiliano Alcázar
 Ivonne Montero as Ángeles Fernández "La Loba"
 Regina Torné as Doña Prudencia Gutiérrez de Alcázar
 Omar Fierro as Ignacio Alcázar
 Gabriela Roel as María Segovia / Lucrecia Aragonés del Águila "La Princesa"
 Anna Ciocchetti as Noelia Torres Velázquez

Recurring 
 Patricia Bernal as Colette Vennua
 Rossana Nájera as Yolanda "Yoli" Contreras
 Mauricio Barcelata as Tito
 Ramiro Huerta as Fabián
 Miguel Ángel Ferriz as Alejandro Alcázar / Antonio Alcázar
 Fernando Becerril as Luis Fernández
 Marta Aura as Teresa Gutiérrez
 Surya MacGregor as Eugenia Torres Velázquez de Alcázar
 Ana Belena as Felicia Yrigoyen Nahman
 Paloma Woolrich as Manuela
 Ana Silvia Garza as Zule
 Sylvia Saenz as María José "Marijo" Alcázar Torres Velázquez
 Luis Miguel Lombana as Salvador Fabiri
 Gabriela Canudas as Claudia Gómez
 Juan Vidal as Alberto Colombo
 Julieta Egurrola as Carmen de la Garza Ruíz "La Güera"
 Javier Díaz Dueñas as Montemayor
 Patricia Palmer as  La Mina

Production
Due to success of this telenovela, Azteca Novelas chosen Maricarmen to produce its replacement, Entre el Amor y el Deseo.
Mauricio Islas, Regina Torne, Ramiro Huerta and Jorge Luis Vazquez reunite in Cielo Rojo, a 2011 telenovela which replaced Entre el amor y el deseo.
Omar Fierro and Anna Ciocchetti had portrayed villain together in Vuélveme A Querer.
Ana belena, Anna Ciochetti and Gabriela Roel reunite in Huérfanas, a 2011 telenovela.

Remake

La Loba was remade as Lara Aishah in Malaysia by Global Station Sdn Bhd which last episode premieres 12 January 2017.

References

2010 telenovelas
2010 Mexican television series debuts
2010 Mexican television series endings
Mexican telenovelas
TV Azteca telenovelas
Spanish-language telenovelas